Bockman is a surname. Notable people with the surname include:

Eddie Bockman
Gerhard Bockman (1686–1773), Dutch portrait painter
Knut Bøckman (1932–2008), Norwegian chess player
Nils Christoffer Bøckman
Peter W. K. Bøckman Sr.
Peter W. K. Bøckman Jr.

See also
Boeckmann
Bøckmann